Tegastidae is a family of copepods, which are characterised by having laterally compressed bodies (resembling that of an amphipod), a claw-like mandible in the nauplius stage, and by a modified male genital complex. 85 species have been described in 6 genera. Two species of Smacigastes are found at hydrothermal vents, while the remaining species are found in shallow water, associated with algae, bryozoans and cnidarians, such as corals.

The six genera are:
Arawella Cottarelli & Baldari, 1987
Feregastes Fiers, 1986
Parategastes Sars, 1904
Smacigastes Ivanenko & Defaye, 2004
Syngastes Monard, 1924
Tegastes Norman, 1903

References

Harpacticoida
Crustacean families